Ruthven-Ayrshire Community School District is a rural public school district headquartered in Ruthven, Iowa. Also serving Ayrshire, the district is located in Palo Alto and Clay counties.

History
The district was formed on July 1, 1983, by the merger of the Ayrshire School District and the Ruthven School District. On July 1, 2010, the South Clay Community School District was dissolved, and portions went to Ruthven-Ayrshire.

In 2011, the district and the Graettinger–Terril Community School District agreed to do athletic team sharing.  In 2013 the district and Graettinger–Terril agreed to a partial-day sharing arrangement in that high school students may spend portions of their school days at each campus for certain courses. They began discussing the idea in October 2012. They had discussed the possibility of whole grade-sharing, but Ruthven-Ayrshire canceled those talks in January 2013, stating that it wanted to have its own students in its own high school. Ruthven-Ayrshire has a partial day sharing agreement with the Emmetsburg Community School District.

Schools
The district operates two schools, both in Ruthven:
 Ruthven-Ayrshire Elementary School 
 Ruthven-Ayrshire High School

Ruthven-Ayrshire High School
The Titans compete in the Twin Lakes Conference in the following sports as G-T/R-A:

Cross country
Volleyball 
Football 
Basketball
Wrestling 
Track and field
Golf 
Baseball 
Softball

See also
List of school districts in Iowa
List of high schools in Iowa

References

Further reading

External links
 Ruthven-Ayrshire Community School District

School districts in Iowa
Education in Clay County, Iowa
Education in Palo Alto County, Iowa
School districts established in 1983
1983 establishments in Iowa